Sergio Romano (born 28 September 1987), is an Italian futsal player who plays for Asti and the Italian national futsal team.

References

External links 
 UEFA profile

1987 births
Living people
Sportspeople from Rome
Italian men's futsal players